Xyris smalliana, Small's yelloweyed grass, is a North American species of flowering plants in the yellow-eyed-grass family. It grows on the coastal plain of the eastern and southern United States from Maine to Texas, as well as in Cuba, Central America, and the State of Tabasco in southern Mexico.

Xyris smalliana is a perennial herb with a stem up to 60 cm (2 feet) tall with long, narrow leaves up to 20 cm (8 inches) long.

References

External links
Photo of herbarium specimen at Missouri Botanical Garden, collected in Nicaragua in 1983

smalliana
Plants described in 1895
Flora of the United States
Flora of Tabasco
Flora of Cuba
Flora of Central America